Oud-Maarsseveen is a hamlet in the Dutch province of Utrecht. It is a part of the municipality of Stichtse Vecht, and lies about 7 km north of Utrecht.

The hamlet was first mentioned around 1200 as Marsenrevene, and means "moorland belonging to Maarssen". The oud (old) was later added to distinguish from Maarsseveen. Oud-Maarsseveen has place name signs. The hamlet started as a land cultivation project. It was home to 507 in 1840.

Gallery

References

Populated places in Utrecht (province)
Stichtse Vecht